Neidr Facula is a bright, irregular depression on the surface of Mercury, located at 35.9° N, 302.7° W.  It was named by the IAU in 2018.  Neidr is the Welsh word for snake.

Neidr Facula is located north of the prominent Rachmaninoff crater and west of the bright Nathair Facula.

References

Surface features of Mercury